The Minister for Community Safety is a Junior ministerial post in the Scottish Government. As a result, the minister does not attend the Scottish Cabinet. The post was created in May 1999 during the 1st Scottish Parliament as the Deputy Minister for Justice. Deputy ministers were renamed ministers after the election of the Scottish National Party in 2007. The minister reports to the Cabinet Secretary for Justice, who has overall responsibility for the portfolio, and is a member of cabinet.

Overview 
The Minister for Community Safety has specific responsibility for:
Community safety
Access to justice
Anti-sectarianism
Anti-social behaviour
Civil law
fire and rescue services
Liquor licensing
Legal profession

History
From 1999 to 2007 responsibility for Community Safety rested with the Minister for Justice and the Deputy Minister for Justice. The Salmond government, elected following the 2007 Scottish Parliament election created the junior post of the Minister for Community Safety who assists the Cabinet Secretary for Justice, in the Scottish Justice Department. After the 2011 Scottish Parliament election the post was renamed Minister for Community Safety and Legal Affairs and was given additional responsibilities for tackling sectarianism. It was renamed again to simply Minister for Community Safety in June 2018.

List of office holders
The incumbent Minister for Community Safety and Legal Affairs is Elena Whitham MSP who was appointed by First Minister Nicola Sturgeon to the role on 3rd November 2022.

See also
Scottish Parliament
Question Time
Scottish Government

References

External links 
The Scottish Cabinet on Scottish Government website
Minister for Community Safety on Scottish Government website

Community Safety
Scots law
Human rights in Scotland
Anti-social behaviour
Fire and rescue in Scotland
Sectarianism
Justice ministers of Scotland